Helonastes is a genus of moths of the family Crambidae.

Species
Helonastes acentrus Common, 1960
Helonastes rubelineola (Wang & Sung, 1981)

References

Schoenobiinae
Crambidae genera